Noyelles-sur-Mer (literally Noyelles on Sea) is a commune in the Somme department in Hauts-de-France in northern France.

Geography

Railways
Noyelles has a railway station on the Boulogne–Amiens line. There is also a heritage railway at Noyelles, the Chemin de Fer de la Baie de Somme, which formed part of the Réseau des Bains de Mer system. A dual gauge line goes to Saint-Valery-sur-Somme, and a metre gauge line continues on to Cayeux. Another metre gauge line goes to Le Crotoy. A further metre gauge line, now closed, went to Forest-l'Abbaye, where it connected with the line between Abbeville and Dompierre-sur-Authie.

Population

Places of interest
 The preserved railway, the Chemin de Fer de la Baie de Somme
 The Chinese cemetery, in the village of Nolette, where 838 Chinese workers are buried. Recruited by the British as part of the Chinese Labour Corps between 1917 and 1919 during and after the First World War, for the most part, they died of Spanish flu.

See also
 Communes of the Somme department
 Chemin de Fer de la Baie de Somme
 Réseau des Bains de Mer

References

External links

 Website about the Chinese cemetery 
  Another website about the Chinese cemetery 

Communes of Somme (department)